The Sialkot Stallions was a National T20 Cup team, based in Sialkot, Punjab, Pakistan. The team was established in 2004 and its home ground was Jinnah Stadium located in Sialkot. 

The Stallions was the most successful team in Pakistani Twenty20 history, having won five consecutive National T20 Cups between 2005/2006 and 2009/10 under the coaching of Azmat Rana. This period of success included a winning streak of 25 consecutive games, a world record for a top-level Twenty20 competition.

Champions League Twenty20
Sialkot Stallions were among eight teams from around the world to secure a berth for the 2008 Champions League Twenty20 that was to be held in India. However, the tournament was cancelled due to 2008 Mumbai Attacks.

The Stallions became the first Pakistan domestic team to officially receive an invitation to play in the Champions League Twenty20, to be held in the South Africa in 2012.
Later on, they got the confirmation from the CLT20's Governing Council after it approved the BCCI's invitation to Sialkot Stallions for participation in CLT20. Then, it was revealed that the Stallions will have to compete (with five other teams from different countries) in Qualifier tournament for two available positions in the Champions League.

Result summary

T20 RESULTS

Sponsor
The Stallions were sponsored by telecommunication giant Ufone in last season.

The 2011 sponsor for Sialkot Stallion is Canon Foam.

In 2011/12 National T20 Cup, Sialkot Stallions was Sponsored by Audionic The Sound Master.

See also
 Pakistan Super League
 Faysal Bank Twenty-20 Cup
 National One-day Championship
 Patron's Trophy
 Pentangular Trophy
 Quaid-i-Azam Trophy

References

External links
Twenty 20 Record page for Sialkot Stallions
Cricketarchive page for Sialkot Stallions

Cricket clubs established in 2004
2004 establishments in Pakistan
Cricket teams in Pakistan
Stallions